The Book of the Unnamed Midwife is post-apocalyptic feminist novel written by American author Meg Elison, published in 2014 by Sybaritic Press. This novel is the winner of the Philip K Dick Award for Distinguished Science Fiction. It is the first novel in The Road to Nowhere Trilogy.

Setting & Plot
The setting begins in San Francisco California after a fever has decimated the world's population. The story of the unnamed midwife is narrated in both personal diary, short narratives. The unnamed midwife travels north from San Francisco, North to East Oregon, and the East to Utah, finally settling in Missouri. Through the midwifes travels, patriarchal confrontation propels the themes of the novel.

The unnamed midwife uses aliases throughout the novel. Aliases include Karen, Alex, Dusty for most of the novel, and finally, Jane. Each transition of the midwife character reflects the following themes throughout the novel.

Themes
The novel explores themes of women's subjugation through sexual violence in the post-apocalyptic United States, questions of gender identity, the spectrum of sexuality and sexual practices, women using violence as a means of defense, women's purpose as natural submissive caretakers. The narrator chooses to avoid the fate of most other women in the novel. Elison's book depicts the fate of women as either sexual enslaver or enslaved people; the unnamed midwife refuses either of these outcomes, choosing to dress and act male as a form of protection.

Origin
In November 2020, the author, Meg Elison, discussed the novel. The first in the series "The Road to Nowhere," which Elison says was named with "dual meaning of utopia...it might be a good place, but its probably no place." Elison also recognized the influence of the Talking Heads song with the same name "Road to Nowhere" as the series' theme music. The second novel in the series is The Book of Etta (2017), which is followed by the finale entitled The Book of Flora (2019).

The Book of the Unnamed Midwife sits with other feminist narratives sharing women's perspectives in apocalyptic settings. Some examples of this narrative are Vox (2018) by Christina Dalcher; Bina Shak's Before She Sleeps (2018); The Water Cure (2018) by Sophie Mackintosh; Larissa Lai's The Tiger Flu (2018); and also Diane Cook's The New Wilderness (2020).

References

2014 American novels
American post-apocalyptic novels
Feminist novels